Susanne Niederhauser (born 13 August 1970) is a professional IFBB female bodybuilder from Wels, Austria.  Niederhauser began bodybuilding when she was 17 years old, and has competed as a professional since 2002. Her inspiration is Cory Everson.

Profile
 Height: 5'6" (168 cm)
 Competition weight: 125 lbs
 Off-season weight: 132 - 140 lbs
 Arms: 15 inches
 Waist: 25.2 inches
 Quads: 22 inches
 Calves: 15 inches

Contest history
 1995 Upper Austrian Championship - 1st
 1995 Austrian Championship - 2nd
 1996 Upper Austrian Championship - 1st overall
 1996 Austrian Championship - 1st
 1997 Austrian Championship - 2nd
 1997 IFBB European Championship (Minsk) - 8th
 1998 Austria Cup (International) - 1st overall
 1998 IFBB World Championship (Alicante, Spain) - 4th
 1999 IFBB World Championship (Sydney, Australia) - 1st
 2000 Austria Cup - 1st
 2000 IFBB World Championship (Warsaw, Poland) - 5th
 2001 World Games (Akita, Japan) - 2nd
 2002 South West Pro Cup (Dallas) - 1st (LW)
 2002 IFBB Ms. Olympia (Las Vegas) - 7th (LW)
 2003 Jan Tana Classic (Charlotte, North Carolina) - 4th (LW)
 2005 Europa Super Show (Texas) - 3rd (LW)
 2005 IFBB Ms. International - 4th (LW)
 2007 IFBB Ms. International - 16th

DVDs
 Susanne Niederhauser - Austrian Muscle Queen (2002)

See also 
List of male professional bodybuilders
List of female professional bodybuilders

External links 
 Official site

1970 births
Austrian female bodybuilders
Living people
Professional bodybuilders
Competitors at the 2001 World Games
World Games silver medalists